The Mississippi State Highway System is a network of roads that are maintained by the Mississippi Department of Transportation (MDOT). This network includes Interstate, U.S., and state highways.

Highway systems

Interstate highways

There are nine interstate highways within the state of Mississippi. This includes six primary interstates and three auxiliary interstates. The longest interstate is I-55, and the shortest interstate is I-110.

U.S. routes

In the state of Mississippi, there are 14 U.S. highways. The longest is US 49, and the shortest being US 425.

Mississippi highways

State highways in Mississippi have different numbering schemes. The primary highways are numbered from 1-76, and most three-digit numbered routes are numbered by region (300s in the northernmost part of the state, 600 in the southernmost). Three-digit numbered routes from 700s to 900s are usually short connectors and spurs.

Other highways
Natchez Trace Parkway starts in Natchez and ends at Nashville, Tennessee. The parkway is maintained by the National Park Service.

History
In 1928, Mississippi Governor Theodore G. Bilbo appointed Horace Stansel head of a committee to investigate the state's highway needs.  Stansel submitted an act to create a state highway system to the state legislature in 1930.  Since then, Mississippi has gradually expanded its highway system.

Until 1987, there were but two major four-lane highways in Mississippi, not counting the Interstates, which were built during the 1960s and 1970s: U.S. Highway 49 (US 49) from Yazoo City to Gulfport and US 82 between Greenville and Winona. Things changed when the state legislature launched the $1.3 billion Four-Lane Highway Program of 1987. In 2002, the Four-Lane Highway Program was expanded in what was known as Vision 21. 

MDOT was not created until 1992; this organization consolidated several services that already existed.

See also

References